Canopus 2 was a single stage, sub-orbital sounding rocket that was built by Argentina. There were a total of three launches during 1969, with no failures. The launch apogee was 150 kilometres in altitude. The vehicle had a length of 4 metres and launch mass of 300 kilograms. It was capable of lifting a 50 kg payload to an altitude of 100 km, and on some flights had an apogee of 150 kilometres.

Canopus was also used as the first stage of the Rigel sounding rocket between 1969 and 1973.

External links
  
 Canopus - Gunter's Space Page

Space programme of Argentina
Sounding rockets of Argentina
Solid-fuel rockets